In particle physics, the odderon corresponds to an elusive family of odd-gluon states, dominated by a three-gluon state. When protons collide elastically with protons or with anti-protons at high energies, even or odd numbers of gluons are exchanged. Exchanging an even number of gluons is a crossing-even part of elastic proton–proton and proton–antiproton scattering, while odderon exchange, i.e. exchange of odd number of gluons, corresponds to a crossing-odd term in the elastic scattering amplitude. It took about 48 years to find a definite signal of odderon exchange.

Description 
In elastic collisions the total kinetic energy of the system is conserved thus the identity of the scattered particles is not modified, no excited states and/or new particles are produced. The kinematics of these collisions is governed by the conservation of both energy and momentum. Data on high-energy elastic proton–proton collisions provided by the TOTEM Collaboration in a teraelectronvolt energy range, together with data from the DØ experiment on elastic proton–antiproton collisions at the Tevatron collider were key ingredients in the discovery of the odderon-exchange. The observed characteristics of the proton–proton collisions did not match the characteristics of the proton–antiproton collisions. As a result, there is an interaction-mediating family of particles (Regge trajectory) that can result in such a deviation in the range of strong interactions. The properties of the odderon are summarised below.

Discovery 
The first paper on the theoretical prediction of possible odderon exchange was published in 1973 by Basarab Nicolescu and Leszek Łukaszuk. The odderon name was coined in 1975 in a paper from the same group (Joynson, D.; Leader, E.; Nicolescu, B. and Lopez, C.)

In December 2020, the DØ and TOTEM Collaborations made public their CERN and Fermilab approved preprint later published in Physical Review Letters in August 2021. The DØ and TOTEM extrapolated TOTEM proton–proton data in the region of the diffractive minimum and maximum from 13, 8, 7 and 2.76 TeV to 1.96 TeV and compared this to DØ proton–antiproton measurement at 1.96 TeV in the same t-range finding an odderon significance of 3.4 σ. TOTEM observed an independent odderon signal at low four-momentum transfers at 13 TeV. When a partial combination of the TOTEM ρ and total cross section measurements is done at 13 TeV, the combined significance ranges between 3.4 and 4.6 σ  for the different models. Combining this with the 3.4 σ effect on the extrapolated proton–proton differential cross-sections resulted in an at least 5.2 σ statistical significance. This is the first statistically significant observation of odderon exchange effects by experimental collaborations. 

A Hungarian-Swedish scaling analysis introduced a new scaling function and observed, model dependently, that in a limited energy range, that includes the DØ energy of 1.96 TeV and the TOTEM energies of 2.76 and 7 TeV, the elastic proton–proton collisions are within the experimental uncertainties independent of the energy of the collision.

In this model dependently determined domain of validity, the Hungarian-Swedish team utilized a direct data-to-data comparison and showed that energy independent scaling function of elastic proton–proton collisions is significantly different from the scaling function of elastic proton–antiproton collisions, hence providing a statistically significant signal for the exchange of the elusive odderon. The preprint of this analysis was made public in December 2019 and its final form it was published in February 2021.

This paper has been seconded in July 2021 by a theoretical paper of Tamás Csörgő, and István Szanyi, increasing the statistical significance of odderon observation to at least 7.08 σ signal. This paper utilized a previously published theoretical model, the so-called real-extended Bialas-Bzdak model, to extrapolate not only the elastic proton–proton scattering data from the LHC energies to the DØ energy of 1.96 TeV but also to extrapolate the elastic proton–antiproton scattering data from 0.546 and 1.96 TeV to the LHC energies of 2.76 TeV and 7 TeV. Evaluating the proton–proton data with a model increased the uncertainty and decreased the odderon signal from proton–proton scattering data alone, but this decrease was well over-compensated with the ability of the model to evaluate theoretically the proton–antiproton scattering at the LHC energies, leading to an overall increase of the statistical significance from 6.26 to 7.08 σ signal.

See also 

 Glueball

References

Bibliography 

 1972: first proposal: Efremov, A. V.; Peschanski, R. (1972). "Evidence for new singularities in Regge phenomenology". OSTI 4691439.
 1973: first publication: Łukaszuk, L.; Nicolescu, B. (1 October 1973). "A possible interpretation of pp rising total cross-sections". Lettere al Nuovo Cimento. 8 (7): 405–413. doi:10.1007/BF02824484. S2CID 122981407.
 1975: odderon named:  Joynson, D.; Leader, E.; Nicolescu, B.; Lopez, C. (1 December 1975). "Non-regge and hyper-regge effects in pion–nucleon charge exchange scattering at high energies". Il Nuovo Cimento A. 30 (3): 345–384. Bibcode:1975NCimA..30..345J. doi:10.1007/BF02730293. S2CID 124183973.
 1980: odderon evolution equation from QCD: Kwieciǹski, J.; Praszałowicz, M. (11 August 1980). "Three gluon integral equation and odd C singlet Regge singularities in QCD". Physics Letters B. 94 (3): 413–416. Bibcode:1980PhLB...94..413K. doi:10.1016/0370-2693(80)90909-0.
 1990: Pomeron and odderon in QCD: Lipatov, L. N. (15 November 1990). "Pomeron and odderon in QCD and a two dimensional conformal field theory". Physics Letters B. 251 (2): 284–287. Bibcode:1990PhLB..251..284L. doi:10.1016/0370-2693(90)90937-2.
 1999: a new odderon intercept from QCD: Janik, R. A.; Wosiek, J. (8 February 1999). "A Solution of the Odderon Problem". Physical Review Letters. 82(6): 1092–1095. arXiv:hep-th/9802100. Bibcode:1999PhRvL..82.1092J. doi:10.1103/PhysRevLett.82.1092. S2CID 17976783.
 2000: odderon from QCD with fixed coupling constant: Bartels, J.; Lipatov, L. N.; Vacca, G. P. (23 March 2000). "A new odderon solution in perturbative QCD". Physics Letters B. 477 (1): 178–186. arXiv:hep-ph/9912423. Bibcode:2000PhLB..477..178B. doi:10.1016/S0370-2693(00)00221-5. S2CID 18651924.
 2003: Odderon in Quantum Chromo Dynamics: Ewerz, Carlo (17 June 2003). "The Odderon in Quantum Chromodynamics". arXiv:hep-ph/0306137. Bibcode:2003hep.ph....6137E.
 2007: Proposal to find the odderon at RHIC and at LHC: Avila, R., Gauron, P. & Nicolescu, B. Eur. Phys. J. C 49, 581–592 (2007).https://link.springer.com/article/10.1140/epjc/s10052-006-0074
 2015: proposal to use LHC data to hunt down the odderon: Ster, András; Jenkovszky, László; Csörgő, Tamás (13 April 2015). "Extracting the Odderon from p p and p p scattering data". Physical Review D. 91 (7): 074018. arXiv:1501.03860. doi:10.1103/PhysRevD.91.074018. S2CID 118354589.
 2015: Odderon in the color glass condensate: Hatta, Y.; Iancu, E.; Itakura, K.; McLerran, L. (3 October 2005). "Odderon in the color glass condensate". Nuclear Physics A. 760 (1): 172–207. arXiv:hep-ph/0501171. Bibcode:2005NuPhA.760..172H. doi:10.1016/j.nuclphysa.2005.05.163. S2CID 2880940.
 2016: Measurement of elastic pp scattering at s=8s=8 TeV in the Coulomb–nuclear interference region: determination of the ρρ -parameter and the total cross-section: TOTEM Collaboration; G. Antchev (Pilsen U.) et al. (Oct 3, 2016). Published in: Eur.Phys.J.C 76 (2016) 12, 661. e-Print: 1610.00603 [nucl-ex].
 2017: First measurement of elastic, inelastic and total cross-section at s=13s=13 TeV by TOTEM and overview of cross-section data at LHC energies: TOTEM Collaboration; G. Antchev (Sofiya, Inst. Nucl. Res.) et al. (Dec 17, 2017). Published in: Eur.Phys.J.C 79 (2019) 2, 103. e-Print: 1712.06153 [hep-ex].
 2017: First determination of the ρ parameter at s=13s=13 TeV: probing the existence of a colourless C-odd three-gluon compound state: TOTEM Collaboration; G. Antchev (CERN) et al. (Dec 16, 2017). Published in: Eur.Phys.J.C 79 (2019) 9, 785. e-Print: 1812.04732 [hep-ex].
 2018: Elastic differential cross-section dσ/dt at s=2.76 TeVs=2.76 TeV and implications on the existence of a colourless C-odd three-gluon compound state: TOTEM Collaboration, G. Antchev (Sofiya, Inst. Nucl. Res.) et al. (Dec 20, 2018). Published in: Eur.Phys.J.C 80 (2020) 2, 9. e-Print: 1812.08610 [hep-ex].
 2018: Elastic differential cross-section measurement at s=13s=13 TeV: TOTEM Collaboration; G. Antchev ( Sofiya, Inst. Nucl. Res.) et al. (Dec 19, 2018). Published in: Eur.Phys.J.C 79 (2019) 10, 861. e-Print: 1812.08283 [hep-ex].
 2019: Odderon from real-to-imaginary ratio at zero four-momentum transfer: Martynov, E.; Tersimonov, G. (27 December 2019). "Ratio ρ p p p p ( s ) in Froissaron and maximal odderon approach". Physical Review D. 100 (11): 114039. doi:10.1103/PhysRevD.100.114039. S2CID 208139556.
 2019: New physics from recent TOTEM measurements: Szanyi, István; Bence, Norbert; Jenkovszky, László (9 April 2019). "New physics from TOTEM's recent measurements of elastic and total cross sections". Journal of Physics G: Nuclear and Particle Physics. 46 (5): 055002. arXiv:1808.03588. Bibcode:2019JPhG...46e5002S. doi:10.1088/1361-6471/ab1205. S2CID 104292347.
 2019: Odderon and proton-substructure from a model-independent Levy expansion: Csörgő, T.; Pasechnik, R.; Ster, A. (28 January 2019). "Odderon and proton substructure from a model-independent Lévy imaging of elastic pp and pp collisions". The European Physical Journal C. 79 (1): 62. doi:10.1140/epjc/s10052-019-6588-8. PMC 6349816. PMID 30774536.
 2019: Odderon effects from the differential cross-sections at TeV energies: Martynov, Evgenij; Nicolescu, Basarab (June 2019). "Odderon effects in the differential cross-sections at Tevatron and LHC energies". The European Physical Journal C. 79 (6): 461. arXiv:1808.08580. Bibcode:2019EPJC...79..461M. doi:10.1140/epjc/s10052-019-6954-6. S2CID 119393479.
 2020: Proposal to search for odderon in central exclusive production at LHC: Lebiedowicz, Piotr; Nachtmann, Otto; Szczurek, Antoni (13 May 2020). "Searching for the odderon in p p → p p K + K − and p p → p p μ + μ − reactions in the Φ ( 1020 ) resonance region at the LHC". Physical Review D. 101(9): 094012. doi:10.1103/PhysRevD.101.094012. S2CID 207870047.
 2020: Odderon from QCD with running coupling constant: Bartels, Jochen; Contreras, Carlos; Vacca, Gian Paolo (28 April 2020). "The Odderon in QCD with running coupling". Journal of High Energy Physics. 2020 (4): 183. arXiv:1910.04588. Bibcode:2020JHEP...04..183B. doi:10.1007/JHEP04(2020)183. S2CID 204008416.
 2021: "Odderon Exchange from Elastic Scattering Differences between pp and pp¯ Data at 1.96 TeV and from pp Forward Scattering Measurements." TOTEM and DØ Collaborations • V.M. Abazov( Dubna, JINR ) et al. (4 August 2021). Published in:  Phys.Rev.Lett. 127 (2021) 6, 062003 • e-Print:  2012.03981 [hep-ex]
 2021: Csörgő, T.; Novák, T.; Pasechnik, R.; Ster, A.; Szanyi, I. (23 February 2021). "Evidence of Odderon-exchange from scaling properties of elastic scattering at TeV energies". The European Physical Journal C. 81 (2): 180 https://arxiv.org/abs/1912.11968. Bibcode:2021EPJC...81..180C. doi:10.1140/epjc/s10052-021-08867-6. S2CID

External links 

 Christophe Royon: The Odderon discovery by the DØ and TOTEM collaborations, Presentation at the 50th International Symposium on Multiparticle Dynamics, July 15. 2021, https://indico.cern.ch/event/848680/contributions/4430297/attachments/2282695/3879781/Thursday-ChristopheRoyon.mp4
 Tamás Csörgő: Optimizing the Signal of Odderon, Presentation at the 50th International Symposium on Multiparticle Dynamics, July 15. 2021, https://indico.cern.ch/event/848680/contributions/4430734/attachments/2282841/3879785/Thursday-TamasCsorgo.mp4
 Tamás Csörgő: Ode to the Odderon, https://indico.fnal.gov/event/48868/contributions/213501/attachments/142715/183985/Ode-to-Odderon-2021-03-11-2021-04-11-accepted-for-publication.pdf
 For a 2021 theory review see also Yu. Kovchegov's CTEQ Webinar, April 28, 2021, https://www.youtube.com/watch?v=yHBO3zcB3V4&feature=youtu.be
 List of Odderon papers with more than 50 citations https://inspirehep.net/literature?sort=mostrecent&size=25&page=1&q=t%20odderon%20and%20topcite%2050%2B
 Georgina Anna Zsóri: An odd interview about the odderon, February 2022, available at: https://medium.com/@georgina.zsori/an-odd-interview-about-the-odderon-4bd080402518
 Georgina Anna Zsóri: Interview with the research group that discovered the odderon, February 2022, available at:https://medium.com/@georgina.zsori/interview-with-the-research-group-that-discovered-odderon-2c02adbb7852
 An Odd New Result of Hungarian and Swedish Researchers: Odd Discovery of the Odderon (Press Release on March 8, 2021): https://archive.gyongyos.uni-mate.hu/en/odd-discovery-odderon
 CERN press release: Odderon Discovered, March 9, 2021: https://cerncourier.com/a/odderon-discovered/

Bosons
Gluons
Hadrons
2019 in science